Episkopi Bay is a bay on the south-western shore of Cyprus, between Paphos and Akrotiri. It is famous for its beaches and fish restaurants. Despite the Turkish invasion and ensuing ethnic division of Cyprus in 1974, a number of Turkish Cypriots chose to remain in the area.

Episkopi Bay is a nesting ground for green and loggerhead turtles, both of which are on the IUCN list of endangered species. Episkopi Turtlewatch is a local volunteer group dedicated to the conservation of the turtles and their nesting beaches.

Geography of Akrotiri and Dhekelia
Bays of Cyprus